Trophon albolabratus is a species of sea snail, a marine gastropod mollusk in the family Muricidae, the murex snails or rock snails.

Description
The shell can grow to be 40mm in length.

Distribution
It can be found off of New Zealand, the Kerguelen Islands, and the South Georgia Islands.

References

Gastropods described in 1875
Trophon